Vera Ivanova (born 1977, Moscow) is a Russian composer.

Life 
She studied music at the Central Music School, studying composition, music theory and the piano, from 1984 to 1995. She studied at the Tchaikovsky Conservatory where she studied with Roman Ledenyov. She studied at the Guildhall School of Music and Drama, with Allessandro Timossi, then at the Eastman School of Music, with David Liptak.

She teaches at Chapman University .

Awards 
Vera Ivanova is the recipient of several awards. She won honorable mention at the Bourges International Electroacoustic Music Competition, and the third prize at the 2001 Salzburg Mozart Competition. She also received a prize at the ASCAP Morton Gould Young Composers Awards, the Hanson Orchestra prize of the Eastman School of Music in 2003, and the André Chevillion - Yvonne Bonnaud Prize at the 2008 Orléans International Piano Competition.

Works 

 Chamber Concerto (1996-97), for 2 pianos
 Concerto for piano and orchestra (1999)
 Confession (2001), for solo violin
 Panic-Melancholy (2001), electroacoustic music
 Variations on chords: Distances (2003), for symphony orchestra
 Aftertouch (2005), for piano 
 Still Images of the Restless Mind (2006), for chamber orchestra
 "Great Waves" from "Sea: the Soul of Spain" (2007), song cycle
 Quiet Light (2009), for solo violin
 Aura (2011), for solo clarinet
 Three Summer Songs (2011), for SSAA a cappella choir
 6 Fugitive Memories (2015), for piano
 May Day (2015), for TTBB a cappella choir
 Sagittarius (2015), mixed quintet
 In the Deep Heart's Core (2017), for piano, fixed audio, and optional projection
 Children's Games (2018), for mixed quintet
 If You Were Coming in the Fall (2019), for choir
 i-sola (2020), for piano
 What Remains After the Dust (2020), for piano
 The Double (2022), chamber opera
 Karkata (2022), for piano

References

External links 

 Vera Ivanova - Three Studies in Uneven Meters (Etudes) for Piano (2011)
 Vera Ivanova, Composer

1977 births
Living people
Russian composers
Russian women composers